Kimberly Leadbetter (born November 20, 1979), better known by her professional stage name Mona Lisa, is an American pop and R&B singer-songwriter, actress, model and record producer. She is best known for her debut single "Can't Be Wasting My Time" featuring the hip hop group Lost Boyz, which was featured on the Don't Be a Menace to South Central While Drinking Your Juice in the Hood soundtrack, as well as her debut album 11-20-79.

In 2011, her collaboration with labelmate DL, "First Klass (That Lyfe)" was released as a digital single. It's the lead single for the King of Paper Chasin''' soundtrack. Her song, "Once Upon a Time" (written by Dennis Cooper) appeared in the film, The Heart Specialist which was released in 2012.

Discography

Albums
1996: 11-20-79TBA: 11-20-79 - 27 Anniversary Edition''

Singles
1996 – "Can't Be Wasting My Time" (featuring Lost Boyz)
1996 – "You Said"
1996 – "Our Time to Shine" (with Lil' Kim ("Don't Be a Menace..." soundtrack)
1997 – "Just Wanna Please U" (featuring The LOX)
1998 – "Peach"
2004 – "Girls" (with Cam'Ron)
2007 – "Get At Me" (with Sonja Blade)
2011 – "First Klass (That Lyfe)" (with DL) ("King of Paper Chasin'" soundtrack)

Other appearances
1996 – "Our Time To Shine (Remix)"  (with Lil' Kim) "Don't Be A Menace..." Soundtrack (chorus/background) 
1996 – "Music Makes Me High" (Lost Boyz "Legal Drug Money" album (chorus/background, uncredited)
1996 – "Renee"  Lost Boyz ("Renee" alternate side Ep Single, chorus/background uncredited)
1997 – "Silent Night" ("A Special Gift" compilation)
1997 – "Somehow" (with Voices of Theory & Kurupt)
1998 – "Get'n It On" ("Woo" soundtrack)
2001 – "Fever" (DJ Famous mixtape 15: R&B is Needed) 
2009 – "Thug Love" (Head Crack "Handle My Business" album)
2012 – "Once Upon a Time" ("The Heart Specialist" soundtrack)

Videography

References

External links
Official Twitter
Official facebook
Official MySpace
Ontourage Entertainment's Official Site
Triplebeam World Official Site

1979 births
Living people
Actresses from New York (state)
African-American actresses
African-American women singer-songwriters
American women pop singers
American hip hop musicians
People from Union, South Carolina
People from Yonkers, New York
Singer-songwriters from New York (state)
21st-century African-American women singers
20th-century African-American women singers
Singer-songwriters from South Carolina